This is a list of notable residents and people who have origins in the Sylhet Division of Bangladesh and the Barak Valley of the Indian state of Assam. This list also includes British Bangladeshis, Bangladeshi Americans, Bangladeshi Canadians, and other non-resident Bengalis who have origins in Greater Sylhet. The people may also be known as Sylheti.

Activism and cause célèbres
 Abdul Muktadir, academician martyred in the Bangladesh Liberation War
 Altab Ali, factory garment worker murdered by three teenagers in a racially motived attack on 4 May 1978.
 Anudvaipayan Bhattacharya, university lecturer martyred in the Bangladesh Liberation War
 Dia Chakravarty, political activist, singer, former political director of the TaxPayers' Alliance and editor of The Daily Telegraph.
 Gurusaday Dutt, founder of the Bratachari movement
 Jagat Joity Das, Mukti Bahini member killed in the Bangladesh Liberation War
 Kakon Bibi, freedom fighter and secret agent in the Bangladesh Liberation War
 Kamala Bhattacharya, student martyred in the Bengali Language Movement of the Barak Valley
 Leela Roy, reformer and politician
 Rawshan Ara Bachchu, woman rights activist and part of the Bengali language movement
 Rubel Ahmed, died in Morton Hall immigration detention centre under controverted circumstances. 
 Sachindra Chandra Pal, student martyred in the Bengali Language Movement of the Barak Valley
 Shamsuddin Ahmed, medical doctor martyred in the Bangladesh Liberation War
 Sushil Sen, martyred in the Indian independence movement
 Suhasini Das, social worker and activist
 Syeda Shahar Banu, woman rights activist and part of the Bengali language movement
 Zobeda Khanom Chowdhury, woman rights activist and part of the Bengali language movement

Art and design
 Dhruba Esh, cover artist and writer
 Jalal Ahmad, president of the Institute of Architects Bangladesh, vice-president of the Commonwealth Association of Architects
 Saiman Miah, architectural and graphic designer, designed one of the two £5 commemorative coins for the 2012 Summer Olympics.

Business and industry

 Abdul Latif, British restaurateur known for his dish "Curry Hell".
 Ayub Ali Master, founder of the Shah Jalal Restaurant in London which became a hub for the British Asian community.
 Bajloor Rashid MBE, businessman and former president of the Bangladesh Caterers Association UK.
 Enam Ali, founder of the British Curry Awards, Spice Business Magazine and Ion TV
 Fazle Hasan Abed KCMG – founder of the world's largest non-governmental organisation, BRAC
 Foysol Choudhury MBE – Businessman, community activist and Chairman of Edinburgh and Lothians Regional Equality Council.
 Iqbal Ahmed OBE – Entrepreneur and CEO of Seamark Group. In 2006, he became the highest British Bangladeshi to feature on the Sunday Times Rich List (listed at number 511).
 James Leo Ferguson, tea industrialist and chairman of the Lakshmiprasad Union
 Mahee Ferdous Jalil, founder of Channel S, owner of Prestige Auto Group and TV presenter.
 Mamun Chowdhury – Businessman, and founder and co-director of London Tradition. In 2014, the company was awarded a Queen's Award for Enterprise for International Trade in recognition of its increase in sales.
 Muquim Ahmed - Entrepreneur who became the first Bangladeshi millionaire at the age of 26 due to diversification in banking, travel, a chain of restaurants with the Cafe Naz group, publishing and property development.
 Ragib Ali – Industrialist, pioneer tea-planter, educationalist, philanthropist and banker
 Shah Abdul Majid Qureshi, first Sylheti to open a restaurant in the United Kingdom
 Shelim Hussain - Founder of Euro Foods (UK)
 Syed Ahmed - Candidate on BBC reality television programme The Apprentice
 Syed Qudratullah Sattar, founder of Moulvibazar
 Mohammad Ajman "Tommy" Miah MBE – Celebrity chef and restaurateur. In 1991, he founded the Indian Chef of the Year Competition.
 Wali Tasar Uddin MBE – Entrepreneur, restaurateur, community leader and Chairman of the Bangladesh-British Chamber of Commerce.

Education and sciences

 Aminul Hoque MBE, lecturer at Goldsmiths, University of London, writer
 Abu Nasr Waheed, educationist, was born in Sylhet in 1878.
 Govinda Chandra Dev, Professor of Philosophy at the University of Dhaka assassinated at the onset of the Bangladesh Liberation War by the Pakistan Army.
 K M Baharul Islam, Dean of the Indian Institute of Management Kashipur
 Mamun al-Mahtab, hepatologist
 M. A. Rashid,  first Vice-chancellor of Bangladesh University of Engineering and Technology
 Mohammad Ataul Karim, Provost and Executive Vice Chancellor of the University of Massachusetts Dartmouth
 Muhammed Zafar Iqbal, physicist, writer and columnist
 Najma Chowdhury, founder of the Women and Gender Studies department in the University of Dhaka, adviser to Caretaker Government of Bangladesh
 Nurul Islam Nahid, former Education Minister of Bangladesh
 Nurunnahar Fatema Begum, head of paediatric cardiology at the Combined Military Hospital (Dhaka)
 Padmanath Bhattacharya Vidya Vinod, professor at Cotton University
 Parvez Haris, biomedical science professor at De Montfort University
 Ragib Ali, founder of Leading University, Jalalabad Ragib-Rabeya Medical College and the University of Asia Pacific
 Sadruddin Ahmed Chowdhury, physicist and vice-chancellor of Shahjalal University of Science and Technology and Sylhet International University
 Sasanka Chandra Bhattacharyya, natural product chemist and director of Bose Institute, Kolkata
 Shafi Ahmed, surgeon and entrepreneur
 Sudhansu Datta Majumdar, physicist and faculty member of the Indian Institute of Technology Kharagpur
 Sundari Mohan Das, founder principal of Calcutta National Medical College
 Syed Manzoorul Islam, critic, writer, former professor of Dhaka University

National Professors of Bangladesh
 Abdul Malik, Brigadier (rtd.), founder of National Heart Foundation
 Dewan Mohammad Azraf, teacher, author, politician
 Jamilur Reza Choudhury, vice-chancellor of University of Asia Pacific, adviser to Caretaker Government of Bangladesh
 Rangalal Sen, academician and writer
 Shahla Khatun, obstetrician and gynecologist

Economists

 Abul Maal Abdul Muhith, former Finance Minister of Bangladesh
 B. B. Bhattacharya, professor and Director of the Institute of Economic Growth in Delhi
 Mohammed Farashuddin, 7th Governor of Bangladesh Bank, founder of East West University
 Mrinal Datta Chaudhuri, theoretical economist, academic and professor of the Delhi School of Economics
 Saifur Rahman, longest serving Finance Minister of Bangladesh and a leader of BNP
 Shah A M S Kibria, economist, diplomat and former executive secretary of the United Nations' ESCAP
 Shegufta Bakht Chaudhuri, 4th Governor of Bangladesh Bank

Entertainment

 Adnan Faruque, actor, presenter, model and YouTuber
 Afshan Azad, actress best known for the role of Padma Patil in Harry Potter
 Ali Shahalom, comedian and television presenter
 Azim, actor best known for the role of Rahim Badshah in Rupban
 Bibhash Chakraborty, theatre personality and actor
 C. B. Zaman, film director, actor, and model
 Helal Khan, film actor and producer
 Islah Abdur-Rahman, film director, actor and screenwriter
 Khaled Choudhury, theatre personality and artist
 Khalil Ullah Khan, film and TV actor
 Marjana Chowdhury, a Beauty pageant residing in the United States
 Nadiya Hussain, columnist, chef, author and TV personality best known for winning the baking competition The Great British Bake Off
 Niranjan Pal, playwright, director and founding member of Bombay Talkies
 Raihan Rafi, film director and screenwriter
 Ruhul Amin, film director
 Salman Shah, film actor
 Shefali Chowdhury, actress best known for the role of Parvati Patil in Harry Potter

Families
 Abaqati family, Uttar Pradeshi family who had jagirs in Sylhet
 Maulvi family of Jitu Miah, Sheikhghat, Sylhet town
 Mazumdars of Sylhet, Nawabs and Qanungoh of Barshala/Gorduar/Mazumdari, Sylhet
 Pal family, a former ruling family of Panchakhanda, Beanibazar
 Nawabs of Prithimpassa, founded by Sakhi Salamat Isfahani
 Sareqaum, custodians of Shah Jalal's dargah complex, founded by Haji Yusuf
 Zamindars of Kanihati, founded by Shah Jalal's companion, Shah Halim ad-Din

Journalism
 Altaf Husain, 1st editor-in-chief of Pakistan's oldest, leading and most widely read English-language newspaper, Dawn and former Industry Minister of Pakistan
 Hasina Momtaz, former press officer for the Mayor of London
 Hassan Shahriar, journalist
 Lenin Gani, senior member of the Bangladesh Sports Journalists Association
 Rizwan Hussain, TV presenter, philanthropist, humanitarian aid worker, barrister and former CEO of Global Aid Trust
 Rizwana Hasan, attorney, Hero of the Environment and winner of the Goldman Environmental Prize and Ramon Magsaysay Award
 Salah Choudhury, editor of Weekly Blitz
 Shamim Chowdhury, TV and print journalist for Al Jazeera English
 Sirajul Hossain Khan, editor of Pakistan Times and the Eastern News Agency.
 Syed Mohammad Ali, founder of The Daily Star - the largest circulating daily English-language newspaper in Bangladesh. 
 Syed Nahas Pasha, journalist and editor of Janomot and Curry Life

Legal
 Abdul Moshabbir, lawyer and politician
 Knight Bachelor Akhlaq Choudhury, first Muslim at the British High Court of Justice
 Irene Khan, seventh Secretary General of Amnesty International, Director-General of the International Development Law Organization
 Khatun Sapnara, judge and first non-white to be elected to the Family Law Bar Association Committee. In 2006, she was appointed as a Recorder of the Crown, which made her the only person of Bangladeshi origin in a senior judicial position.
 Shohid Ali, advocate

Literature

 Abdur Rouf Choudhury, writer
 Abed Chaudhury, Bangladeshi-Australian geneticist and science writer
 Achyut Charan Choudhury, writer and historian
 Arjumand Ali, first Bengali Muslim novelist
 Arun Kumar Chanda, freedom fighter, social worker, writer and editor of the Saptak
 Asaddor Ali, writer and researcher of Sylheti folk literature
 Ashraf Hussain, poet, writer, researcher of folk literature
 Chowdhury Gulam Akbar, writer and collector of Bengali folk literature for the Bangla Academy
 Dilwar Khan, poet known as Gonomanusher Kobi (Poet of the mass people)
 Dwijen Sharma, naturalist and science writer
 Faruque Ahmed, author
 Gurusaday Dutt, folklorist
 Hason Raja, minstrel and writer of mystical songs
 Ibrahim Ali Tashna, poet, Islamic scholar and activist
 Ismail Alam, Urdu poet and activist
 Mufti Nurunnessa Khatun, writer, academic, and botanist
 Muhammad Mojlum Khan, non-fiction writer best known for The Muslim 100
 Muhammad Nurul Haque, cultural activist, social worker and writer
 Sadeq Ali, writer, poet and judge best known for the Halat-un-Nabi puthi
 Shahida Rahman, author and publisher
 Syed Mujtaba Ali, author, journalist, travel enthusiast, academician, scholar and linguist.
 Syed Murtaza Ali, writer and historian
 Syed Pir Badshah, Persian-language writer
 Syed Rayhan ad-Din, celebrated Persian-language writer
 Syed Shah Israil, considered to be Sylhet's first author
 Syed Sultan, wrote the first Prophetic biography in Bengali in 16th century

Military
 Anwarul Momen, general officer commanding 17th Infantry Division
 Ashab Uddin, major general and ambassador to Kuwait and Yemen
 Hasan Mashhud Chowdhury, 11th Chief of Army Staff of the Bangladesh Army
 Ismail Faruque Chowdhury, engineer-in-chief of the Bangladesh Army
 Bangabir M. A. G. Osmani, Supreme Commander of the Mukti Bahini
 Mahbub Ali Khan, Bangladesh Navy rear admiral and the Chief of Naval Staff
 Mahmudur Rahman Majumdar, Bangladesh Army brigadier, formerly the most senior ethnic Bengali in the Pakistan Army
 Mohammad Abdur Rab, 1st Chief of Army Staff of the Bangladesh Army, Major general during the Bangladesh Liberation War
 Muhammad Ghulam Tawab, Bangladesh's second Chief of Air Staff
 Nurul Huq, second temporary chief of Bangladesh Navy
 Prince Garuda of Gour, fought against the Muslims during the Conquest of Sylhet
 Syed Mohammad Ziaul Haque, Bangladesh Army officer and fugitive
 Syed Nasiruddin – Sipah Salar of Shamsuddin Firoz Shah

Monarchs and rulers
Chronological list of articles:
 Gangadhwaj Govardhan, 20th king of the Gour Kingdom
 Madan Rai, penultimate minister of Gour
 Amar Singh, military general and short-lasted minister of Brahmachal under Govardhan
 Jaidev Rai, governor of Brahmachal (southern Sylhet) under Tripura Kingdom
 Gour Govinda, final king of the Gour Kingdom, defeated in the Conquest of Sylhet
 Mona Rai, final minister of Gour
 Sikandar Khan Ghazi, first wazir of Srihat
 Haydar Ghazi, second wazir of Srihat
 Muqabil Khan, wazir of Srihat in 1440
 Khurshid Khan, minister of Srihat, constructed numerous mosques
 Majlis Alam, dastur of Srihat, constructed numerous mosques
 Sarwar Khan, Nawab of Sylhet after Gawhar Khan
 Mir Khan, Nawab and Qanungoh of Sylhet
 Bayazid of Sylhet, Baro-Bhuyan Afghan chieftain who ruled over North Sylhet
 Muhammad Sani, Manipur migrant
 Khwaja Usman, Baro-Bhuyan Afghan chieftain who ruled over South Sylhet
 Mubariz Khan, Mughal sardar of Sylhet, fought against many Baro-Bhuiyan chieftains
 Mukarram Khan, Mughal sardar of Sylhet who would later become Subahdar of Bengal
 Mirak Bahadur Jalair, Mughal sardar of Sylhet
 Sulayman Banarsi, Mughal co-sardar of Sylhet, governed over southern parts of Sylhet
 Lutfullah Shirazi, Mughal faujdar of Sylhet from 1658 to 1665
 Isfandiyar Khan, Mughal faujdar of Sylhet
 Syed Ibrahim Khan, Mughal faujdar of Sylhet
 Jan Muhammad Khan, Mughal faujdar of Sylhet
 Mahafata Khan, Mughal faujdar of Sylhet
 Farhad Khan, most well-known Mughal faujdar of Sylhet
 Sadeq Khan, Mughal faujdar of Sylhet
 Inayetullah Khan, Mughal faujdar of Sylhet and founder of Inatganj
 Rafiullah Khan, Mughal faujdar of Sylhet
 Ahmad Majid, Mughal faujdar of Sylhet
 Abdullah Shirazi, Mughal faujdar of Sylhet and mosque builder
 Robert Lindsay, 4th superintendent and 1st collector of Sylhet from 1778 to 1790
 Ganar Khan, last faujdar of Sylhet

Music and dance
 Alaur Rahman, singer and music teacher
 Amina Khayyam, dancer and choreographer
 Bidit Lal Das, folk singer and composer
 Debojit Saha, playback singer
 Gouri Choudhury, music teacher
 Kalika Prasad Bhattacharya, folk singer
 Mumzy Stranger, singer, producer and lyricist
 Radharaman Dutta, lyricist and composer of folk and traditional dhamail
 Ramkanai Das, classical and folk musician
 Rowshanara Moni, singer and actress
 Runa Laila, playback singer
 Sanjeeb Chowdhury, singer and journalist
 Shah Abdul Karim, minstrel and folk songwriter
 Shapla Salique, singer and harmonium player
 Shushama Das, folk musician
 Shuvro Dev,  playback singer
 Subir Nandi, playback singer

Politics and government

Bangladesh

 Abdus Shahid, former chief whip for Bangladesh Awami League
 Ariful Haque Choudhury, Mayor of Sylhet
 Badar Uddin Ahmed Kamran, former Mayor of Sylhet
 C. M. Shafi Sami, former Bangladeshi diplomat
 Hafiz Ahmed Mazumder, chairman of Bangladesh Red Crescent Society, Pubali Bank Board of Directors and founder of Scholarshome
 Humayun Rashid Choudhury, former speaker of the Jatiya Sangsad, 41st President of the UN General Assembly
 Ilias Ali, Organizing Secretary of the Bangladesh National Party
 Mifta Uddin Chowdhury Rumi, vice-president of Bangladesh Nationalist Party-Sunamganj
 Shafiqur Rahman, Amir of Bangladesh Jamaat-e-Islami
 Syed Muazzem Ali, foreign service officer, high commissioner and career diplomat

Chief Justices
 J. R. Mudassir Husain, 14th Chief Justice of Bangladesh
 Mahmudul Amin Choudhury, 11th Chief Justice of Bangladesh
 Surendra Kumar Sinha, 21st Chief Justice of Bangladesh
 Syed A. B. Mahmud Hossain, 2nd Chief Justice of Bangladesh

Local
 Abdul Hakeem Chowdhury, East Pakistan Provincial council and National Assembly
 Abdul Majid Khan, former MP for Habiganj-2 
 Abdul Matin, former MP for Moulvibazar-2
 Abdul Munim Chowdhury, former MP for Habiganj-1
 Abdul Muqit Khan, former MP for Sylhet-3
 Abdul Jabbar, former MP for the erstwhile Sylhet-13 constituency 
 Abdul Qahir Chowdhury, former MP for Sylhet-5
 Abdur Raees, East Pakistan Provincial council and National Assembly
 Abdur Rahim, former MP for Sylhet-6
 Abu Lais Md. Mubin Chowdhury, former MP for Habiganj-3
 Abu Zahir, former MP for Habiganj-3
 Abul Hasnat Md. Abdul Hai, former member of the Jatiya Sangsad
 AKM Gouach Uddin, former MP for Sylhet-6
 Ameena Begum Shafiq, doctor and Jamaat-e-Islami politician
 Barun Roy, former MP for Sunamganj-1
 Dewan Farid Gazi, former leader of Habiganj-1
 Dildar Hossain Selim, former MP for Sylhet-4
 Enamul Haque Chowdhury, former MP for Sylhet-2
 Fatema Chowdhury Paru, BNP politician
 Gazi Mohammad Shahnawaz, MP for Habiganj-1
 Gulzar Ahmed Chowdhury, former MP for Sunamganj-3
 Harris Chowdhury, former MP for Sylhet-5
 Ismat Ahmed Chowdhury, MP for Habiganj-1
 Joya Sengupta, politician and doctor
 Khalilur Rahman Chowdhury, MP for Habiganj-1
 Khandaker Abdul Malik, former MP for Sylhet-1
 Lutfur Rahman, former MP for Sylhet-6
 Mahmud Us Samad Chowdhury, former MP for Sylhet-3
 Mahbub Ali, former MP for Habiganj-4
 Maqsood Ebne Aziz Lama, former MP for Sylhet-2
 MM Shahin, former MP for Moulvibazar-2 
 Moazzem Hossain Ratan, former MP for Sunamganj-1
 Mokabbir Khan, MP for Sylhet-2
 Mohibur Rahman Manik, former MP for Sunamganj-5
 Mostafa Ali, member of the Bangladesh Constituent Assembly and former Governor of Habiganj
 Najmul Hasan Zahed, former MP for Habiganj-2
 Naser Rahman, former MP for Moulvibazar-3 and chairman of the Saifur Rahman Foundation
 Nawab Ali Abbas Khan, Jatiya Party politician and three-time MP for Moulvibazar-2
 Nazim Kamran Choudhury, former MP
 Pir Fazlur Rahman, former MP for Sunamganj-4
 Salim Uddin, former MP for Sylhet-5
 Shafi Ahmed Chowdhury, former MP for Sylhet-3
 Shah Azizur Rahman, former MP for Sylhet-2
 Sharaf Uddin Khashru, former MP for Sylhet-6
 Sheikh Sujat Mia, former MP for Habiganj-1 
 Sultan Mohammad Mansur Ahmed, member of Jatiya Sangsad and previously vice-president of Dhaka University Central Students' Union
 Syed Mahibul Hasan, former MP for Sylhet-16
 Syed Makbul Hossain, former MP for Sylhet-6
 Syeda Saira Mohsin, former MP for Moulvibazar-3
 Yahya Chowdhury, former MP for Sylhet-2

Ministers
 Abdul Haque, former Land Administration and Reforms Minister
 Abdul Mannan, Minister of Planning
 Abdus Samad Azad, former Foreign Minister of Bangladesh
 AK Abdul Momen, Minister of Foreign Affairs
 Enamul Haque Mostafa Shahid, former Minister of Social Welfare
 Imran Ahmad, Minister of Expatriates' Welfare and Overseas Employment
 Mukhlesur Rahman Chowdhury, former Adviser to President Iajuddin Ahmed
 Shamsher M. Chowdhury, Bangladeshi diplomat and former secretary of the Ministry of Foreign Affairs
 Shahab Uddin, Minister of Environment, Forest and Climate Change
 Suranjit Sengupta, former Minister of Railways
 Syed Mohsin Ali, former Minister of Social Welfare
 Tawfiq-e-Elahi Chowdhury, energy adviser to the Prime Minister of Bangladesh
 Rasheda K Chowdhury, primary and mass education adviser to the Caretaker Government led by Fakhruddin Ahmed

British India
 Abdul Matlib Mazumdar, freedom fighter and political leader known for retaining the Barak Valley in India
 Bipin Chandra Pal, Indian nationalist, one third of the Lal Bal Pal triumvirate
 Nawab Ali Haider Khan, 9th Nawab of Longla, minister and leader of the Independent Muslim Party
 Syed Abdul Majid CIE, first native minister of Assam, pioneer of the agricultural industry

Pakistan
Abdul Hamid, Education Minister of Assam and later East Bengal
Abu Ahmad Abdul Hafiz, Sylhet Muslim League founder and lawyer
Abdul Hoque, politician, lawyer and freedom fighter
Moulvi Abdus Salam, Revenue Minister of East Bengal
Abdul Khaleque Ahmed, member of the 3rd National Assembly of Pakistan
Abdul Matin Chaudhary, member of the 1st National Assembly of Pakistan and Pakistan's first Minister of Agriculture
Abdul Muntaquim Chaudhury, member of the 3rd National Assembly of Pakistan
Aftab Ali, founder of All-India Seamen's Federation and vice-president of All-India Trade Union Congress
Ajmal Ali, member of the 4th National Assembly of Pakistan
Akhay Kumar Das, member of the 1st National Assembly of Pakistan
Basanta Kumar Das, member of the 2nd National Assembly of Pakistan
Begum Serajunnessa Choudhury, member of the 3rd National Assembly of Pakistan
Mahmud Ali, Freedom Movement leader, statesman
Mohammad Keramat Ali, entrepreneur, philanthropist and politician
Mushahid Ahmad Bayampuri, member of the 3rd National Assembly of Pakistan
 Ibrahim Ali Tashna, poet, Islamic scholar and activist
Muazzam Ahmed Choudhury, member of the 4th National Assembly of Pakistan
Muhammad Amin, member of the 3rd National Assembly of Pakistan
Murtaza Raza Choudhry, member of the 1st National Assembly of Pakistan
Saiful Alom, member of the East Bengal Legislative Assembly
Qamarul Ahsan, member of the 3rd National Assembly of Pakistan

India
 Abdul Munim Choudhury, former MLA of Karimganj South
 A. F. Golam Osmani, Indian National Congress member
 Amar Chand Jain, Bharatiya Janata Party politician
 Anwar Hussain Laskar, All India United Democratic Front politician
 Ashab Uddin, member of the Manipur Legislative Assembly
 Ataur Rahman Mazarbhuiya, All India United Democratic Front politician
 Azad Zaman, member of the Meghalaya Legislative Assembly
 Aziz Ahmed Khan, former MLA of Karimganj South
 Bijoy Malakar, MLA of Ratabari
 Chittendra Nath Mazumder, Bharatiya Janata Party politician
 Dilip Kumar Paul, Bharatiya Janata Party politician
 Dwarka Nath Das, Bharatiya Janata Party politician
 Hazi Salim Uddin Barbhuiya, MLA of Hailakandi
 Kabindra Purkayastha, senior leader of Bharatiya Janata Party in Assam
 Kali Ranjan Deb, Bharatiya Janata Party politician
 Kamalakhya Dey Purkayastha, former MLA of Karimganj North
 Karnendu Bhattacharjee, Indian National Congress member
 Kartik Sena Sinha, Bharatiya Janata Party politician
 Kripanath Mallah, Bharatiya Janata Party politician
 Krishnendu Paul, MLA of Patharkandi
 Lalit Mohan Suklabaidya, Indian National Congress member
 Madhusudhan Tiwari, former MLA of Patharkandi (1991-1996)
 Mission Ranjan Das, Bharatiya Janata Party politician
 Moinul Hoque Choudhury, five-time MLA, two-time UN General Assembly representative and Minister of Industrial Development
 Nepal Chandra Das, Indian National Congress member
 Nihar Ranjan Laskar, Indian National Congress member
 Parimal Suklabaidya, Bharatiya Janata Party politician
 Radheshyam Biswas, All India United Democratic Front politician
 Rajdeep Roy, Bharatiya Janata Party politician
 Ramapayare Rabidas, Bharatiya Janata Party politician
 Rashida Haque Choudhury, former Minister of State of Social Welfare
 Sambhu Sing Mallah, Bharatiya Janata Party politician
 Santosh Mohan Dev, former cabinet minister of the Government of India and 7-time Member of Parliament from Silchar, Assam and Tripura South.
 Satyabrata Mookherjee, former Minister of State
 Shukhendu Shekhar Dutta, former MLA of Patharkandi
 Siddique Ahmed, MLA of Karimganj South
 Subodh Das, MP for Panisagar
 Surendra Kumar Dey, first Union Cabinet minister for Cooperation and Panchayati raj 
 Sushmita Dev, President of the All India Mahila Congress
 Suzam Uddin Laskar, All India United Democratic Front politician
 Tathagata Roy, controversial right-wing Hindutva associate

West

 Anwar Choudhury, The British High Commissioner for Bangladesh between 2004 and 2008. He is currently the Director of International Institutions at the Foreign & Commonwealth Office.
 Apsana Begum, first Hijabi to be elected as an MP for the British parliament
 Doly Begum, Canadian politician  
 Gaus Khan, president of the United Kingdom Awami League
 Hansen Clarke, former congressman of MI 13
 Lutfur Rahman, the first directly elected mayor of Tower Hamlets and the first Bangladeshi leader of the council.
 Nadia Shah, former Mayor of Camden. The first female mayor in the United Kingdom of Bangladeshi origin.
 Nasim Ali OBE, former Mayor of Camden. He became UK's youngest mayor as well as the first Bangladeshi and first Muslim mayor.
 Rabina Khan, councillor for Shadwell and former Housing Cabinet member in Tower Hamlets
 Rushanara Ali, first Bangladeshi to be elected as an MP for the British parliament

Religion and spirituality

Islam

 Abdul Latif Chowdhury Fultali, Islamic scholar and founder of the Fultali movement
 Abdul Momin Imambari, former president of Jamiat Ulema-e-Islam Bangladesh
 Shaikh-e-Fulbari Abdul Matin Chowdhury, a religious scholar and political activist
 Abu Hena Saiful Islam, US Navy's imam
 Ajmal Masroor, imam, TV presenter and politician
 Ali Sher Bengali, 16th-century Sufi saint of the Shattari order
 Athar Ali, Deobandi scholar, author and founder of the Nizam-e-Islam party
 Farid Uddin Chowdhury, former MP for Sylhet-5
 Ibrahim Ali Tashna, Islamic scholar, poet and activist
 Ibrahim Danishmand, zamindar and Sufi scholar
 Muhammad Arshad, 16th-century Persian-language scholar
 Mushahid Ahmad Bayampuri, Islamic scholar and parliamentarian
 Najib Ali Choudhury, founder of the Madinatul Uloom Bagbari, the first madrasa in the Greater Sylhet region
 Nur Uddin Gohorpuri, chairman of Befaqul Madarisil Arabia Bangladesh
 Nurul Islam Olipuri, mufassir and teacher
 Obaidul Haque Wazirpuri, former president of Befaqul Madarisil Arabia Bangladesh
 Tafazzul Haque Habiganji, former vice-president of Hefazat-e-Islam and Jamiat Ulema-e-Islam
 Ubaidul Haq, former khatib of Baitul Mukarram
 Zia Uddin, president of Jamiat Ulema-e-Islam Bangladesh
 Zohurul Hoque, doctor and translator of the Qur'an

Shah Jalal's disciples
 Shah Jalal, Sufi saint associated with spreading Islam to Sylhet
 Ghazi Burhanuddin, considered to be Sylhet's first Muslim
 Haji Muhammad Yusuf, first custodian of Shah Jalal's dargah
 Adam Khaki, associated with spreading Islam to Badarpur
 Aziz Chishti, companion of Shah Jalal
 Khanda Jhokmok, companion of Shah Jalal
 Shah Gabru, associated with spreading Islam to Osmani Nagar
 Shah Halim ad-Din Narnauli, associated with spreading Islam to Kanihati
 Shah Kamal Quhafa, late disciple of Shah Jalal
 Shah Malum, associated with spreading Islam to Fenchuganj
 Shah Mustafa, associated with spreading Islam to Moulvibazar
 Shah Paran, early disciple and nephew of Shah Jalal
 Shah Ruknuddin, associated with spreading Islam to Rajnagar
 Shah Siddiq, associated with spreading Islam to Osmanpur
 Shah Tajuddin, associated with spreading Islam to Tajpur
 Syed Yaqub, associated with spreading Islam to Barlekha

Other
 Agha Muhammad Reza - Claimed to be the Mahdi and twelfth imam, engaged in battles against the East India Company and Kachari Kingdom
 Krishna Chaitanya - Hindu mystic
 Shantidas Adhikari, associated with spreading Hinduism to Manipur

Sports

Bangladesh

Cricket
 Abu Jayed Rahi, cricketer
 Abul Hasan, cricketer
 A. K. M. Mahmood, cricketer
 Ahmed Sadequr, cricketer for Sylhet Division
 Alok Kapali, cricketer for Bangladesh
 Ardhendu Das, cricketer for Bengal (1934-1942)
 Ebadot Hossain, cricketer for Bangladesh
 Enamul Haque Jr, Bangladesh
 Hasibul Hossain, cricketer for Sylhet Division
 Henry Plowden, cricketer
 Imtiaz Hossain, cricketer
 Khaled Ahmed, cricketer for Bangladesh
 Nasirul Alam, cricketer for Sylhet Division
 Nasum Ahmed, cricketer for Bangladesh
 Nazmul Hossain, Bangladesh
 Punya Datta, cricketer for Bengal and Cambridge University
 Rahatul Ferdous, cricketer
 Rajin Saleh, cricketer for Bangladesh
 Rezaul Haque, cricketer for Sylhet Division
 Sayem Alam, cricketer for Sylhet Division
 Shahanur Rahman, cricketer for Sylhet Division
 Shanaj Ahmed, cricketer for Sylhet Division
 Tapash Baisya, cricketer for Bangladesh

Football

 Alfaz Ahmed, former footballer for Bangladesh
 Hamza Choudhury, midfielder for English football club Leicester City F.C.
 Kaiser Hamid, former footballer for Mohammedan SC
 Mahbubur Rahman Sufil, footballer and captain of Arambagh KS
 Yeamin Ahmed Chowdhury Munna, footballer for Chittagong Abahani

Other
 Abdul Ali Jacko, two-time world lightweight kick-boxing champion
 Bulbul Hussain, wheelchair rugby player for Kent Crusaders and the Great Britain Paralympic team
 Rani Hamid, chess master, awarded the FIDE Woman International Master (WIM) title in 1985
 Ramnath Biswas, soldier and writer best known for circumnavigating the globe by bicycle.
 Ruqsana Begum – 2010 female atomweight Muay Thai kickboxing champion and nominated captain of the British Muay Thai Team.

India
 Pritam Das, cricketer
 Ketaki Prasad Dutta, former president of the District Sports Association, Karimganj

Fictional characters
Ameera Khatun (played by Manjinder Virk in Call the Midwife)
Avell (played by Sayfuz Ali in Badman)
Ayub Mohammed (played by Shahnewaz Jake in Call the Midwife)
Faizal's mother (played by Nina Wadia in Corner Shop Show)
Faruk Khatun (played by Abhisek Singh in Call the Midwife)
Farzina Mohammed (played by Salma Hoque in Call the Midwife)
Jahangeer Bruiser (played by Sayfuz Ali in Corner Shop Show)
Malik Begum, the main protagonist of the British web series Corner Shop Show played by Islah Abdur-Rahman
Rahul Mohammed (played by Ahaan Gupta in Call the Midwife)
Saleem Akbar Chowdhury Shamsul Haque (played by Ali Shahalom in Corner Shop Show)
Samad Miah (played by Ameet Chana in Corner Shop Show)
Zaki (played by Islah Abdur-Rahman in Man Like Mobeen)

References

Lists of Bangladeshi people
 
Lists of people by ethnicity
Bengal
Lists of Bangladeshi people by district